Dollar bill may refer to:

Currency
Dollar bill, a banknote (or bill) of any of the currencies that are named dollar
Australian one-dollar note
United States one-dollar bill

Music
Dollar Bill (group), a Swedish hip hop group 
"Dollar Bill" (song), by Screaming Trees from Sweet Oblivion

Fictional characters
Dollar Bill, a recurring character in Billions
Dollar Bill, a character in Lego Agents
Dollar Bill, a  minor character in Watchmen

See also
Bill Dollar (1950-1996), real name William Everett Dollar, radio host and DJ
"Million Dollar Bill", a song by Whitney Houston